Sharna Bass (born 21 May 1997) is an English singer. She is featured on the Clean Bandit single "Extraordinary". Bass also has a twin brother, Sean Bass, in the industry who was also spotted by Clean Bandit and sings the vocals in their song Stronger.

Clean Bandit found Bass when she was very young through their music production scheme; they operated out of South Kilburn Studios, and the studios had a scheme in which artists could use the studios for free if a trainee was taken on.

Discography

Singles
As featured artist

References

1997 births
Living people
Singers from London
21st-century English singers
21st-century English women singers